Berks, Bucks and Oxon Division 5 was a short lived English rugby union league featuring teams from Berkshire, Buckinghamshire and Oxfordshire. As with all of the divisions in this area at this level, the entire league was made up of second, third and fourth teams of clubs whose first teams play at a higher level of the rugby union pyramid.

Berks/Bucks & Oxon 5 Honours

References

See also
English Rugby Union Leagues
English rugby union system
Rugby union in England

Rugby union leagues in the English Midlands
Rugby union in Oxfordshire
Rugby union in Buckinghamshire
Rugby union in Berkshire